Borobi was the official mascot of the 2018 Commonwealth Games, in Gold Coast, Queensland, Australia. Borobi is a male koala with blue fur and unusual markings on his paws (which are designed by Aboriginal artist, Chern’ee Sutton). The name Borobi is derived from a dialect used by the Yugambeh people, an indigenous Australian group from the Gold Coast region. The mascot, along with its fictional back story, was revealed in April 2016. Borobi is based on a character submitted by Merrilyn Krohn, the winner of the GC2018 Mascot Design Competition.

A year after the 21st Commonwealth games, Borobi has been announced to serve as the animated ‘Indigenous language champion’ to promote the local Yugambeh language and culture. The annual ‘Borobi Day’ has been revealed on 31 May in order to raise awareness of indigenous languages among everyone in Australia.

Borobi Fan Trail 
The Borobi Fan Trail was a trail of Borobi's footprints stretching from Southport to Broadbeach meant to keep visitors healthy throughout the games. Along the trail are several statues of Borobi dressed in attire for different sports.

See also

List of Australian sporting mascots
List of Commonwealth Games mascots
Clyde (mascot)
Karak (mascot)
Matilda (mascot)
Shera (mascot)

References

External links

Mascot
Animal mascots
Australian mascots
Mascots introduced in 2018
Commonwealth Games mascots
Fictional people from Queensland